Beauharnois (also known as Beauharnois—Salaberry) was a federal electoral district in Quebec, Canada, that was represented in the House of Commons of Canada from 1867 to 1935, from 1949 to 1953, and from 1968 to 1972.

Beauharnois riding was created in the British North America Act of 1867. It was merged into Beauharnois—Laprairie riding in 1933.

In 1947, "Beauharnois" riding was re-created from Beauharnois—Laprairie and Châteauguay—Huntingdon.

In 1952, it became "Beauharnois—Salaberry". It reverted to "Beauharnois" from 1966 to 1971, and from 1976 to 1977. The rest of time it was known as "Beauharnois—Salaberry" as it is known as today.

See Beauharnois—Salaberry for information on this riding after 1952.

Description
Beauharnois initially consisted of the area bounded on the north-east and south-east by the County of Chateaugai, on the south-west by the south-western limits of the Seigniory of Beauharnois, on the north-west by the River St. Lawrence, including all islands nearest to and wholly or in part opposite the said County. It comprised the Parishes of Saint Clément, Saint Louis de Gonzague, Saint Stanislas de Kostka, Ste. Cecile and Saint Timothée.

In 1924, it was redefined to consisted of the County of Beauharnois including the City of Valleyfield.

It was abolished in 1933, and redistributed into Beauharnois—Laprairie and Châteauguay—Huntingdon.

In 1947, it was re-created, and defined to consist of the county of Beauharnois, the city of Salaberry-de-Valleyfield, the towns of Maple Grove and Beauharnois, the municipality of St. Joachim-de-Châteauguay, the towns of Châteauguay and De Léry, and the municipality of St. Anicet and Ste. Barbe.

It was renamed Beauharnois—Salaberry in 1952.

Members of Parliament

This riding has elected the following Members of Parliament:

Election results

Beauharnois, 1867–1935

|-
  
|Conservative
|Joseph-Gédéon-Horace Bergeron 
|align="right"|776 
 
|Unknown
|L. A. Seers
|align="right"| 763 
 
|Unknown
|J. B. C. St. Amour
|align="right"|28   

|-
  
|Liberal
|George di Madeiros Loy
|align="right"|1,822    
  
|Conservative
|Joseph-Gédéon-Horace Bergeron  
|align="right"|1,663

Beauharnois, 1949–1953

See also 
 List of Canadian federal electoral districts
 Past Canadian electoral districts

External links 
Riding history from the Library of Parliament:
Beauharnois, Quebec (1867 - 1933)
Beauharnois, Quebec (1947 - 1952)
Beauharnois, Quebec (1966 - 1971)
Beauharnois, Quebec (1976 - 1977)
 Website of the Parliament of Canada

Former federal electoral districts of Quebec